Mary Alice Harriman (March 12, 1861 – December 24, 1925) was a poet, author (of poetry, novels, short stories and non-fiction) and publisher. She was called the "only woman publisher in the world" in the 1911 Who's Who in the Northwest.  She published books in Seattle between 1907 and 1910, and in New York after that, closing her publishing business in 1913.

She wrote A Man of Two Countries, Chaperoning Adrienne; a tale of the Yellowstone national park (illustrated by Charles M. Russell) and Will Thou Not Sing.

Marriage mystery

The only year in which she used the name Harriman-Browne was in 1907 in her books, including the book about Chaperoning Adrienne. The next year, she started a publishing company, using only her maiden name, Harriman.  In Seattle, on May 2, 1907, she married Seneca F. Browne.

She gave different marital statuses when asked to list whether married.

Alice was listed as single in the 1870 census (she was 9) and the 1880 census (she was 19). Most of the 1890 census was destroyed by fire. In the 1900 census and 1910 census, she is listed as divorced. In the 1920 census, as well as the Who's Who guides of 1911 and 1914, she is listed as widowed. Finally, on the Biographical Index Cards, 1781–1990, Sacramento, California: California State Library she is listed as widowed.

Death
Harriman died in Hollywood, California, where she lived.

Publishing
Harriman began publishing books in 1907 in Seattle. She continued there until 1910, moving her business to 542 Fifth Avenue, New York City. Her company was the "Alice Harriman Company, publishers of fine books".

Causes
Harriman was interested in Native American issues, and friend to Adelaide Hanscom Leeson, of the Photo Secessionist Movement. One Native-American-themed book she published was The Brand by Therese Broderick. This girl's adventure book influenced a young Nez Perce girl living in rural Idaho to become one of the first female Native American writers.  That girl, Mourning Dove, wrote Cogewea.

Books published
 Reminiscences of Seattle: Washington Territory and the U. S. Sloop-of-War Decatur During the Indian War of 1855-56 by Thomas Phelps, The Alice Harriman Company, Seattle, 1908 Online text
 Pioneer Days on Puget Sound by Arthur Armstrong Denny, The Alice Harriman Company, Seattle, 1908 Online text
 Lyrics of Fir and Foam Alice Rollit Coe, The Alice Harriman Company, Seattle, 1908 Online text
 Chronicle of Oldfields by Thomas Newton Allen, The Alice Harriman Company, Seattle, 1909 Online text
 Love Never Faileth by J. D. O. Powers, 1909
 The Road of Life, and other poems by Marion Couthouy Smith, The Alice Harriman Company, Seattle, 1909 Online text
 The Brand, a tale of the Flathead reservation by Therese Broderick, The Alice Harriman Company, Seattle 1909 Online text
 Marcus Whitman, Pathfinder and Patriot by Myron Eells, The Alice Harriman Company, Seattle, 1909 Online text
 Songs o' the Olympics by Alice Harriman, illustrated by B. C. Bubb, 1909
 Browning; Biographical notes, appreciations, and selections from his "Fifty Men and Women" by Pauline Leavens, The Alice Harriman Company, New York; Seattle, 1910 Online text
 The Diamond Spider and Other Stories by Elinor Brotherton Butler,  illustrated by C.M. Dowling, The Alice Harriman Company, New York, 1910
 A Man of Two Countries by Alice Harriman, The Alice Harriman Company, New York; Seattle, 1910 Online text
 An Athabascan Princess by George Fenwick, illustrated by Max W. Kollm, pub. The Alice Harriman Company, New York; Seattle, 1910 Online text
 Trails Through Western Woods by Helen Fitzgerald Sanders, The Alice Harriman Company, New York; Seattle, 1910 Online text
 The Flame by Louise E Taber, The Alice Harriman Company, New York, 1911 Online text
 The Stairway on the Wall by Augusta Prescott, The Alice Harriman Company, New York, 1911 Online text
 The Temptation of St. Anthony by Gustave Flaubert, The Alice Harriman Company, New York, 1911 Online text
 Wilt Thou Not Sing? A Book of Verses by Alice Harriman, The Alice Harriman Company, New York 1912 Online text
 Yermah the Dorado by Frona Eunice Wait Colburn Online text
 Don Diego by Albert B. Reagan, The Alice Harriman Company, New York, 1914 Online text

Works by herCongress of American Aborigines at the Omaha Exposition in Overland Monthly, San Francisco, June 1899, pages 505-512, Mary Alice Harriman Online textPacific History Stories, Montana Edition by Alice Harriman, The Whitaker and Ray Company, San Francisco, 1903. Online textSongs o' the Sound by Alice Harriman with illustrations by Frank Calvert, The Stuff Printing Concern, Seattle, 1906. Online textTillicum Tales: Seattle Writers Club; story inside Old Bill's Awkward Squad by Alice Harriman-Browne, Lowman & Hanford, Seattle, 1907. Online textChaperoning Adrienne: A Tale of the Yellowstone National Park by Alice Harriman-Browne, Metropolitan Press, Seattle, 1907. Online textThe Lightning Bug, by Alice Harriman and 	J M S Lane, The Metropolitan Press, Seattle, c1907Lemon Juice, formerly published as Lightning Bug, c1908Songs o' the Olympics by Alice Harriman, Alice Harriman Co., Seattle, 1909.Redcoat and RedskinA Man of Two Countries; chapter headings by C.M. Dowling, 1910. Online textWilt Thou Not Sing? A Book Of Verses, 1912 Online textBells and Their Overtones, 1918.The bells of El Camino Real'', 1925

See also
 Page with biography.
Late in life, she took an interest in solving a historical mystery.
A text version of old story, Harriaman's discovery of a Russian Empire bell on the West Coast.
LA Times version of the Bell Story, with picture of bell.

References

External links
 
 

20th-century American novelists
American women novelists
American women poets
American publishers (people)
1861 births
1925 deaths
Writers from Seattle
People from Newport, Maine
American women short story writers
20th-century American poets
19th-century American short story writers
20th-century American short story writers
19th-century American women writers
20th-century American women writers
Novelists from Washington (state)